Mount Custer is a mountain in the Livingston Range, Glacier National Park in the U.S. state of Montana. Herbst Glacier is immediately northeast of the peak. The mountain is probably named for George Armstrong Custer, of Custer's Last Stand.

Climate

Based on the Köppen climate classification, Mount Custer has in a subarctic climate characterized by long, usually very cold winters, and short, cool to mild summers. Temperatures can drop below −10 °F with wind chill factors below −30 °F.

Geology

Like other mountains in Glacier National Park, Mount Custer is composed of sedimentary rock laid down during the Precambrian to Jurassic periods.

See also

 List of mountains and mountain ranges of Glacier National Park (U.S.)
 Geology of the Rocky Mountains

References

External links
 Weather: Mount Custer

Livingston Range
Mountains of Flathead County, Montana
Mountains of Glacier County, Montana
Mountains of Glacier National Park (U.S.)
Mountains of Montana